Dumble was a guitar amplifier manufacturer in Los Angeles, California.In the one-person operation, Alexander "Howard" Dumble (June 1, 1944 – January 16, 2022) made each amp personally. Because of this, Dumble amplifiers are the most expensive boutique amplifiers on the used market, and prices have risen rapidly. In 2012, Vintage Guitar magazine described the Dumble Overdrive Special as the most valuable in the product line, with used amplifiers fetching between $70,000 and $150,000. Other examples have sold for more.

Dumble built two or three amplifiers per year, primarily for celebrity musicians and studios. He priced them similarly to the used market to dissuade resale. Dumble serviced and refurbished his original amplifiers for a fee, and many players would buy used Dumble amplifiers and have Dumble refurbish them. Carlos Santana and Ben Harper, for example, both bought their first Dumble used, and had Dumble refurbish the amp for their particular playing styles.

History 
Howard Alexander Dumble began modifying Fender tweed and blackface amplifiers in 1963. Before he was 21, Mosrite, in Santa Cruz, hired Dumble to build a special line of Amplifiers for The Ventures. By the late 1970s, he was modifying and building high-gain amps in the way that Randall Smith of Mesa Boogie, and others did. Dumble, however, was not interested in selling amplifiers in greater numbers, but focused solely on getting the best possible sound. Building to order only (even building his own speaker cabinets by hand), his amps gained a positive reputation and became highly sought after by professional musicians. Dumble became known as a tube electronics master, and his high end clientele gained him a reputation as a reclusive amplifier tech to the stars.

Much of the company's PR over the years has been word of mouth. Howard Dumble did some interviews and advertisements in the 80s—but few people knew about him, even in the professional music community. Carlos Santana, for instance, only heard of Dumble in reference to Stevie Ray Vaughan in the late 90s. After someone loaned him an amplifier (it wasn't for sale) he "was hooked for life." He subsequently contacted Howard Dumble, and was able to buy a used amp and have Dumble refurbish it. Reportedly he has since bought more.

Since the 1980s, Dumble covered the preamp circuitry of his amps with a thick layer of usually opaque epoxy, presumably protecting his circuit's exact design from prying eyes. There are other practical reasons for covering circuits in epoxy: it keeps the parts firmly in place, and specially formulated epoxy can conduct heat well, although it will always have less surface area to dissipate heat than the bare components. One such application of this was in the 1971 UREI 1176LN version C. Bill Putnam covered the additional "Low Noise" portion he developed for the 1176 in version C with black epoxy.

Around 2000 Dumble preferred to be called by his second name Alexander. As of 2017, Dumble still built and serviced amplifiers for mainly prominent recording artists. However, if someone were to purchase a used amplifier, Dumble offered free servicing. In his older age, he only produced about five to ten amps per year. He loved to build his Ultraphonix and Rockphonix amps into Fender and Marshall chassis. The interiors are built from ground up  and they are very popular with his customers. Known famous players owning either an Ultra- or Rockphonix Amp are Clapton, Ford, Frampton, KW Shepard, Kravitz, Chris Cobb, Felder.

On May 13, 2021, guitarist Don Felder published an Instagram story with a photo of Dumble servicing his ‘65 Fender Deluxe Reverb. This was the first photo, or sighting, of Dumble in over 30 years.  Dumble died in January 2022, at the age of 77. Robben Ford shared a video statement on his social media, and said that Dumble had been in poor health for a long time. After his passing, another recent picture of Dumble emerged of him playing the guitar, allegedly through the very first amplifier he ever built.

Amp models

Overdrive Special 

The Overdrive Special is a two channel amplifier, with a clean channel and a second "overdrive" channel. This overdrive channel "cascades" from the first channel into at least one additional gain stage in the overdrive channel. This means that the clean channel tone stack and gain stages cascade into the gain stage of the overdrive channel, overdriving the clean channel. In a sense, the overdrive channel sits "on top" of the clean channel. This is Dumble's most popular model, and subsequently is the most frequently seen. That said, the Overdrive Special (ODS) varies from decade to decade, and serial number to serial number. For example, though most ODS amplifiers use 6L6 tubes in the power section (commonly associated with Fender amps), some have EL34 tubes (commonly associated with Marshall amps).

On the other hand, even the many 6L6 versions of the ODS vary considerably. For example, some have a clean channel that stays clean "all the way up to 10" (referencing a gain potentiometer ranging from 1 to 10). Others have a clean channel that starts to "break up" around 3. Some overdrive channels can only reach a minimal amount of breakup, even when dialed up. However, most ODS overdrive channels have a large amount of tube distortion available. Many later versions of the ODS have "HRM" controls on the inside of the amplifier, which is a "hot rubber monkey" tone stack that sits "on top" of the overdrive channel or, in other words, comes after the overdrive channel tube gain stage.

There are commonalities across all ODS amplifiers. Firstly, the ODS amps are known for their harmonic richness in the overdrive channel breakup, and transparent "open-ness" in the clean channel. Guitarists describe the overdrive channel using terms like sustaining, blooming, and musical—and call the clean channel "fast", "huge", and "responsive". Robben Ford describes the tone of the ODS as having "a perfect sonic curve, the lows are deep and rich but not unclear, it doesn't mush out like some amps will. You have the frequencies there for your use. The mid range [is] punchy and clear and the high end, bright, clear but doesn't hurt your ears. It's loud but it sounds good."

In an interview with Premier Guitar, Ford claims that Dumble told him that the original inspiration for the Overdrive Special came while watching Ford play live in the 1970s at a bar in Santa Cruz. Ford was using a mid-60s blackface Fender Bassman, and running a tube screamer in front of it to overdrive the tubes to breakup. Supposedly, Dumble liked Ford's sound, and while contemplating it had the revelations that led to the original Overdrive Special. Since buying his ODS, Ford has almost exclusively used his original Dumble or an exact clone of it in live performances.

Overdrive Reverb 
An Overdrive Special amplifier with an internal Reverb Circuit.

Steel String Singer 
The Steel String Singer is an adjustable single channel "clean" amplifier with reverb.. Fewer than 12 of the original Steel String Singers have been accounted for.

As is typical with Dumble amplifier models, the Steel String Singer (SSS) varies from serial number to serial number. For example, The first SSS (made for Henry Kaiser) has a built-in vibrato circuit. Also, despite its reputation for a clean sound, the earlier SSS (and possibly #7) breaks up when the input gain is turned up or pushed by a strong input signal. Earlier versions also had more complicated phase inversion techniques that had been pioneered in vintage high fidelity amplifiers, and Fender style transformers. Starting with #4, Dumble simplified the phase inversion and gave the amp more negative feedback, which further cleaned up the signal. These updates significantly changed the sound and feel of the circuit, and became standard to the SSS model from #4 and on. The sound the Steel String Singer is most known for is a "clean feedback" effect, in which the amplifier feeds back, even though the signal remains clean. This is most apparent in later SSS models, though a balance of factors contribute to this behavior, and earlier SSS versions and other Dumble models reportedly imitate the effect under certain conditions.

Most common features of every Steel String Singer are control oriented. Every SSS has special high and low cut filters that adjust overall tone late in the circuit. Every SSS has reverb, and every SSS has special coupling techniques and a larger chassis style. Guitarists often characterize its sound as extremely clean and compressed, with dynamic response and a lush reverb circuit. Its EQ is generally considered relatively flat internally, but malleable through the front panel controls and overall responsiveness. There are reportedly "higher highs" and "lower lows" that are not often heard through other amplifiers, and a significant amount of harmonic response to the strength of the input signal.

Notable owners and users of the Steel String Singer include: Stevie Ray Vaughan, Eric Johnson, David Lindley, Jackson Browne, John Mayer, Kirk Hammett, and Henry Kaiser.

Manzamp 
A single channel "no frills" combo amplifier, similar in appearance to the tweed Bassman. This was the most expensive amplifier on Dumble's amplifier price sheet in the 90s. Bonnie Raitt is a notable original owner of a Manzamp.

Dumbleland 
One of the earliest Dumble amplifiers, this was also the model that Stevie Ray Vaughan and Double Trouble used for 80% of the guitar tracks on their debut album, Texas Flood, which was recorded at Jackson Browne's studio. Browne is a long time friend of Dumble, and owns some of his earliest amplifiers (including the first Overdrive Specials). Jackson Browne's collection of amplifiers introduced Vaughan to Dumble's amps, and Browne introduced Vaughan to Dumble so that he could buy his first Steel String Singer.

Winterland 
The Winterland was a 300-watt bass amplifier Dumble made in the 1970s.

Tonestacks 
Despite the variability among Dumble tonestack voicing and operation, most Dumble amplifiers have certain controls in common:

 Bass, Middle, and High frequency potentiometers
 Two voicings to choose from: Jazz, and Rock
 Boosts for each frequency – deep, and bright (some have mid boosts)
 An EQ bypass that bypasses the tonestack entirely (some models have an actual boost rather than a bypass)
 Overall power amp Presence control, or a Contour tone cut (most have one or the other, but some  have neither)

Dumbleator 

Dumble also made a tube-buffered external effects loop called a Dumbleator. A few Dumble amps have a Dumbleator circuit built in, but most have "un-buffered" input jacks that tap directly out of the pre-amp and into the power amp. Dumble likely created this external loop because of the difficulty of fitting effects loop buffering into the amplifier chassis (and the limited use of effects loops for most players). The Dumbleator has separate Send and Receive controls for the effects, and a Bright switch on at least the return. Later models also have a Bright switch on the send. Dumble also made stereo versions. This effects loop buffering is essentially a cathode follower for the send, into a gain stage for return.

Notable players 
 Eric Clapton (has used various Dumble amps and Dumble modified/ refurbished Fenders over the years)
 Sonny Landreth (Overdrive Special) 
 Stephen Bruton (had a low-watt Dumble with 4 10" speakers)
 Larry Carlton Overdrive Special
 Robben Ford (bought an Overdrive Special in 1983 and had a model custom-built in 1993/4)
 David Lindley (original owner of Overdrive Special #2, and Steel String Singer #3, and used them in stereo live)
 John Mayer (Steel String Singer – also has a large collection of used Dumble amplifiers)
 Lowell George had an early custom Dumble head he used for most of his career.
 Carlos Santana (has at least one Overdrive Reverb and a Steel-String Singer purchased in the early 2000s, and uses Bludotone clones of his Dumbles live besides his Mesa Boogies)
 Stevie Ray Vaughan (Steel String Singers – original owner of both #7 and #8, and had an association with #9)
 Henry Kaiser (1978 Dumble Overdrive Special, original and current owner of Steel String Singer #1, original owner of SSS #4, other ODS's as well)
 Joe Bonamassa (owns a couple of Overdrive Specials) 
 Keith Urban (Overdrive Special) 
 Steve Kimock – 50-watt and 100-watt Dumble Overdrive Specials 
 Ben Harper – 3 × Overdrive Specials (50w head + 2×12" Cabinet, 100/50w 1×12" Combo, 100/40w Head + matching 1×12" Cabinet) In March 2016, Harper explained that Dumble had him plug his guitar directly into the oscilloscope so he could note the frequency patterns of Harper's instruments and voice Harper's Overdrive Special accordingly.
 Eric Johnson (Steel String Singer, Overdrive Special) 
 Kirk Hammett (Steel String Singer) 
 Jason Isbell (Dumble modified Fender Pro) 
 Kenny Wayne Shepherd (Dumble modified Tweed Deluxe, nicknamed "Tweedle-Dee.")
 Jackson Browne (Original owner of Overdrive Special #1, Dumbleland, and Steel String Singer #2)
 Ry Cooder Ry was the original owner of the Dumble Borderline Special (a 50 watts Overdrive Special with added tremolo effect). According to some sources Ry got so fed up of waiting for repairs or customizing, he put the amp head in Dumble’s driveway and drove over it with his car, destroying the amp.

References

External links 

 

Guitar amplifier manufacturers
Audio equipment manufacturers of the United States